Gaetano Caridi (born 22 July 1980) is an Italian former professional footballer who played as a midfielder.

Career 
Caridi was born in Reggio Calabria. He began his career playing for minor Tuscan club Pontedera. He made his debut with the then-Serie C2 club in 1999, aged 19, playing 22 matches and scoring four goals. He then earned a move to promotion chasing Serie C1 side Alzano Virescit, where he made 15 appearances before being loaned to Avellino in January 2001. With the biancoverdi, he played 10 matches scoring three goals before returning at Alzano.

After 15 league matches played for Alzano in the first half of the 2001–02 season, he was signed by Serie C2 side Mantova in January 2002 

The 2002–03 season proved to be a turning point for the 22-year-old Caridi. He agreed to sign for free with Mantova and proved instrumental to make telling passes as Mantova came close to promotion. In 2003–04 Caridi made 32 appearances, scoring 8 goals as Mantova earned promotion to Serie C1.

In 2004–05 Mantova earned promotion to Serie B at their first attempt, with Caridi helping to create many of the goals with his technique and vision, as well as scoring 10 goals.  Mantova finish fourth, losing a third consecutive promotion on playoffs to Torino, and Caridi scored 14 league goals in the process. In 2006–07 Caridi confirmed his qualities, scoring an impressive 11 goals in 35 matches, many of them coming from direct free kicks. 

In July 2010 he completed his move to Tuscan Serie B team U.S. Grosseto F.C. Caridi played his first match in pre-season friendly on 22 July. On 13 July 2012, Caridi joined newly promoted Serie B club F.C. Pro Vercelli 1892 on a free transfer.

In January 2013 he signed an 18-month contract with Cremonese; since the summer of 2014 he returned to the military in the Mantova.

Coaching career
After retiring at the end of the 2018–19 season, F.C. Pro Vercelli 1892 announced on 11 July 2019, that Caridi would become the assistant manager of Alberto Gilardino for the club's first team. He followed Gilardino as his assistant also at Siena, throughout the 2020–21 Serie D and 2021–22 Serie C seasons; they were both dismissed from their jobs on 24 October 2021.

References

External links
 Caridi’s career details
 Gaetano Caridi at Soccerway

1980 births
Living people
Sportspeople from Reggio Calabria
Italian footballers
Footballers from Calabria
Association football midfielders
Serie B players
Serie C players
Serie D players
FC Chiasso players
U.S. Città di Pontedera players
Virtus Bergamo Alzano Seriate 1909 players
U.S. Avellino 1912 players
Mantova 1911 players
F.C. Grosseto S.S.D. players
F.C. Pro Vercelli 1892 players
U.S. Cremonese players
Italian expatriate footballers
Italian expatriate sportspeople in Switzerland
Expatriate footballers in Switzerland